Dunes of Corrubedo Natural Park (Galician: Dunas de Corrubedo e Lagoas de Carregal e Vixán) is a  natural park on the Atlantic coast of Spain. It is one of six natural parks in the autonomous community of  Galicia. It is situated at the very end of the A Barbanza Peninsula in the province of A Coruña.

Conservation
The natural park was designated in 1992.  Its international importance as a wetland was recognised the following year, when it became a Ramsar site.

The natural park is an important site for bird-life and the European Union has included it within a Special Protection Area.

Gallery

See also
Conservation movement
United Nations Environment Programme

References

Province of A Coruña
Natural parks of Spain
Ramsar sites in Spain
Special Protection Areas of Spain
Protected areas established in 1992
Protected areas of Galicia (Spain)